Hai may be: 
Central Banda language
Mashami language (Chaga)